Martadoris amakusana is a species of colourful sea slug, a dorid nudibranch, a marine gastropod mollusk in the family Polyceridae. 
It was originally placed in Tambja before being re-assigned to the new genus Martadoris in 2017.

Distribution
This species was described from Tomioka, Amakusa, Japan. It has been reported from Bali, Indonesia.

References

Polyceridae
Gastropods described in 1987